Anissa Haddaoui (born 30 May 1991) is a Dutch-Moroccan boxer, kickboxer, muay thai fighter and BJJ practitioner, who has been professionally competing since 2008. 

She is a former EBF two weight European champion, IRO European and World kickboxing champion, World Fighting League Muay Thai Champion and Muay Thai tournament winner, as well as the Kunlun Fight World Mulan Championship winner. She has also won the IBJJF European BJJ Championships bronze medal as a white belt.

Combat Press ranked her as one of the top ten female fighters since August 2017. Combat Press ranks her as the #10 female pound for pound fighter in the world, as of November 2020.

Kickboxing and muay thai career
Anissa Haddaoui made her professional kickboxing debut in 2008. Her first fight was against Helen Garnett, who gave Haddaoui her first professional loss, by unanimous decision.

In 2013 Haddaoui faced Rachel Adamus during Rumble of the North III for the IRO European Title which she won by unanimous decision.

In 2016 Haddaoui entered the World Fighting League 65 kg Tournament. In the semi finals she defeated the future Enfusion world champion Sheena Widdershoven by unanimous decision. In the finals she fought Ilona Wijmans which she won by unanimous decision.

Haddaoui fought Rachel Adamus during The Warriors 4 for the IRO World Title, winning by unanimous decision.

She next entered the Kunlun Fight Mulan Legend Tournament. She defeated Marisa Pires in the quarter finals, but lost to Laëtitia Madjene in the semi finals. Madjene would later withdraw from the tournament and Haddaoui fought Wang Kehan in the final. which she won by unanimous decision.

In March 2018 Haddaoui defended her WFL title against Michaela Michel in which she would lose the title through unanimous decision.

Haddaoui entered the 2018 edition of the Mulan Legend as well. Despite defeating Shi Lijiang in the quarter finals, she would drop a split decision to Zhu Mengjia in the semi finals.

Mixed martial arts career
Haddaoui has two MMA fights to date. The first was in 2014 against Lena Buytendijk during Battle Under The Tower, which she lost by unanimous decision. The second came in 2017 against Antonina Shevchenko, during Phoenix FC 3, when she once again lost by unanimous decision.

Championships and accomplishments

Boxing
European Boxing Federation
EBF European 63.5 kg Championship
EBF European 65 kg Championship

Kickboxing
International Ringsports Organisation
IRO European 65 kg Kickboxing Championship
IRO World 65 kg Kickboxing Championship
Kunlun Fight
Kunlun Fight World Mulan Championship, 61.5 kg

Muay Thai
World Fighting League
WFL 4-Woman A-Class Muay Thai 65 kg Tournament Winner
WFL 65 kg Muay Thai Championship

Brazilian Jiu Jitsu
IBJJF European Championship
2015 White Belt Middleweight: 3rd Place

Kickboxing record

|-  bgcolor=
|-  bgcolor="#CCFFCC"
| 24 Feb 2019|| Win||align=left| Zhang Ye || Kunlun Fight 80 || Shanghai, China || TKO (Injury) || 1 || 3:00|| 
|-  bgcolor="#FFBBBB"
| 9 Sep 2018|| Loss||align=left| Zhu Mengjia  || Kunlun Fight 76 || Zhangqiu, China || Decision (Split) || 4 || 3:00|| 
|-
! style=background:white colspan=9 |
|-
|-  bgcolor="#CCFFCC"
| 9 Sep 2018|| Win||align=left| Shi Lijiang || Kunlun Fight 76 || Zhangqiu, China ||Decision (Unanimous) || 3 || 3:00|| 
|-
! style=background:white colspan=9 |
|-
|-  bgcolor="#CCFFCC"
| 6 May 2018|| Win||align=left| Anke Van Gestel || Kunlun Fight 73 || Sanya, China ||Decision (Unanimous) || 3 || 3:00|| 
|-
|-  bgcolor="#CCFFCC"
| 25 Mar 2018|| Win||align=left| Michaela Michl || World Fighting League: Final 8 Wildcard Tournament || Almere, Netherlands ||Decision (Unanimous) || 3 || 3:00|| 
|-
! style=background:white colspan=9 |
|-
|-  bgcolor="#CCFFCC"
| 26 Aug 2017|| Win||align=left| Kamila Balanda || Ladies Fight Night 6: IRA || Rawa Mazowiecka, Poland || Decision (Unanimous) || 3 || 3:00|| 
|-  bgcolor="#CCFFCC"
| 15 Jul 2017|| Win||align=left| Wang Kehan || Kunlun Fight 64 || Chongqing, China || Decision (Unanimous) || 3 || 3:00|| 
|-
! style=background:white colspan=9 |
|-
|-  bgcolor="#FFBBBB"
| 14 May 2017|| Loss||align=left| Laëtitia Madjene || Kunlun Fight 61 || Sanya, China || Decision (Unanimous) || 3 || 3:00|| 
|-
! style=background:white colspan=9 |
|-
|-  bgcolor="#CCFFCC"
| 30 Oct 2016|| Win||align=left| Marisa Pires || Kunlun Fight 54 || Wuhan, China || Decision (Unanimous) || 3 || 3:00|| 
|-
! style=background:white colspan=9 |
|-
|-  bgcolor="#CCFFCC"
| 8 Oct 2016|| Win||align=left| Rachel Adamus || The Warriors 4 || Norg, Netherlands || Decision (Unanimous) || 5 || 3:00|| 
|-
! style=background:white colspan=9 |
|-
|-  bgcolor="#CCFFCC"
| 10 Sep 2016|| Win||align=left| Alisa Bazhukova || Ladies Fight Night 3: The FeMMAgeddon || Warsaw, Poland || Decision (Unanimous) || 3 || 3:00|| 
|-
|-  bgcolor="#FFBBBB"
| 7 May 2016|| Loss||align=left| Anke Van Gestel || King Of The Ring IX || Hamme, Belgium || Decision (Unanimous) || 3 || 3:00|| 
|-
|-  bgcolor="#CCFFCC"
| 3 Apr 2016|| Win||align=left| Ilona Wijmans || World Fighting League: Where Heroes Meet Legends || Almere, Netherlands || Decision (Unanimous) || 3 || 3:00|| 
|-
! style=background:white colspan=9 |
|-
|-  bgcolor="#CCFFCC"
| 3 Apr 2016|| Win||align=left| Sheena Widdershoven || World Fighting League: Where Heroes Meet Legends || Almere, Netherlands || Decision (Unanimous) || 3 || 3:00|| 
|-
! style=background:white colspan=9 |
|-
|-  bgcolor="#CCFFCC"
| 5 Nov 2015|| Win||align=left| Daria Albers || One More II || Oostzaan, Netherlands || Decision (Unanimous) || 3 || 3:00|| 
|-
|-  bgcolor="#CCFFCC"
| 2014|| Win||align=left| Sanja Trbojevic || ? || Netherlands || TKO || ? || 3:00|| 
|-
|-  bgcolor="#CCFFCC"
| 2 Nov 2013|| Win||align=left| Rachel Adamus || Rumble of the North III || Netherlands || Decision (Unanimous) || 5 || 3:00|| 
|-
! style=background:white colspan=9 |
|-
|-  bgcolor="#CCFFCC"
| 10 Nov 2012|| Win||align=left| Marieke Post || Old School Martial Arts Events || Netherlands || KO || 3 || 3:00|| 
|-
|-  bgcolor="#CCFFCC"
| 30 Sep 2012|| Win||align=left| Martina Jindrová || Girls Fight Only 8 || Wormer, Netherlands || TKO || 3 || 3:00|| 
|-
|-  bgcolor="#CCFFCC"
| 6 May 2012|| Win||align=left| Jaleesa Alfons || The Battle of Wormer || Wormer, Netherlands || Decision (Unanimous) || 3 || 3:00|| 
|-  bgcolor="#FFBBBB"
| 2008|| Win||align=left| Helene Garnett || ? || Sheffield, England || Decision (Unanimous) || 5 || 3:00|| 
|-
| colspan=9 | Legend:

Mixed martial arts record

|Loss
|align=center|0–2
|Antonina Shevchenko
|Decision (unanimous)
|Phoenix FC 3
|
|align=center|3
|align=center|5:00
|London, England
|
|-
|Loss
|align=center|0–1
|Lena Buytendijk
|Decision (unanimous)
|Battle Under The Tower
|
|align=center|3
|align=center|5:00
|Steenwijk, Netherlands
|

See also
List of female kickboxers

References

1991 births
Living people
Dutch female mixed martial artists
Moroccan female mixed martial artists
Mixed martial artists utilizing kickboxing
Mixed martial artists utilizing boxing
Mixed martial artists utilizing Muay Thai
Mixed martial artists utilizing Brazilian jiu-jitsu
Dutch women boxers
Moroccan women boxers
Dutch female kickboxers
Moroccan female kickboxers
Dutch Muay Thai practitioners
Moroccan Muay Thai practitioners
Female Muay Thai practitioners
Dutch practitioners of Brazilian jiu-jitsu
Moroccan practitioners of Brazilian jiu-jitsu
Female Brazilian jiu-jitsu practitioners
Kunlun Fight kickboxers
Kunlun Fight kickboxing champions